This is the list of notable stars in the constellation Eridanus, sorted by decreasing brightness.

See also
List of stars by constellation

References 

List
Eridanus